Harvey Helm (December 2, 1865 – March 3, 1919) was a United States representative from Kentucky. He was born in Danville, Kentucky. He attended the Stanford Male Academy and was graduated from the Central University of Kentucky in 1887. He studied law and was admitted to the bar in 1890 and began practice in Stanford, Kentucky.

Helm was a member of the Kentucky House of Representatives in 1894 and the county attorney of Lincoln County, Kentucky 1897-1905. He was a delegate to the Democratic National Convention in 1900. Helm was elected as a Democrat to the Sixtieth and to the six succeeding Congresses and served from March 4, 1907, until his death before the commencement of the Sixty-sixth Congress. While in Congress, he was chairman, Committee on Expenditures in the Department of War (Sixty-second Congress) and the Committee on the Census (Sixty-third through Sixty-fifth Congresses). He died in Columbus, Mississippi in 1919 and was buried in Buffalo Spring Cemetery, Stanford, Kentucky.

See also
List of United States Congress members who died in office (1900–49)

References

1865 births
1919 deaths
Politicians from Danville, Kentucky
Democratic Party members of the Kentucky House of Representatives
Democratic Party members of the United States House of Representatives from Kentucky
19th-century American politicians